Han Xuan (born 2 February 1991), is a Chinese footballer who currently plays as a centre-back for Chengdu Rongcheng.

Club career
Han Xuan started his professional football career in 2009 when he joined Beijing Baxy for the 2009 China League Two campaign. On 2 January 2016, Han transferred to Chinese Super League side Yanbian Funde. On 28 February 2017, Han transferred to China League One side Beijing Renhe.

On 27 February 2018, Han transferred to Chinese Super League side Henan Jianye. He made his Super League debut on 18 August 2018 in a 2–1 away defeat against Dalian Yifang, coming on as a substitute for Zhong Jinbao in the 90th minute. After three seasons he transferred to second tier club Chengdu Rongcheng where he would establish himself as a regular within the team as he aided them to promotion at the end of the 2021 league campaign.

Career statistics 
Statistics accurate as of match played 8 January 2023.

References

External links
 

1991 births
Living people
Chinese footballers
Footballers from Wuhan
Association football defenders
China League Two players
China League One players
Chinese Super League players
Beijing Sport University F.C. players
Yanbian Funde F.C. players
Beijing Renhe F.C. players
Henan Songshan Longmen F.C. players
21st-century Chinese people